USS PGM-5 was a PGM-1 class motor gunboat that served in the United States Navy during World War II.  She was originally laid down as an SC-497 class submarine chaser on 14 May 1942 by the Wilmington Boat Works in Wilmington, California and launched on 2 November 1942.  She was commissioned as USS SC-1056 on 15 June 1943.  She was later converted to a PGM-1 class motor gunboat and renamed PGM-5 on 10 December 1943.  After the war she was transferred to the Foreign Liquidations Commission on 7 May 1947.  Her exact fate is unknown.

References
Motor Gunboat/Patrol Gunboat Photo Archive: PGM-5
USS SC-1056 (SC-1056)
see PGM-3 for service details

PGM-1-class motor gunboats
Ships built in Los Angeles
1942 ships
World War II gunboats of the United States